Hensbach is a small river of Bavaria, Germany. It flows into the Main near Aschaffenburg.

See also
List of rivers of Bavaria

Rivers of Bavaria
Rivers of the Spessart
Rivers of Germany